Jangal Rural District is a rural district (dehestan) in the Central District of Fasa County, Fars Province, Iran. At the 2006 census, its population was 4,694, in 1,158 families.  The rural district has 39 villages.

References 

Rural Districts of Fars Province
Fasa County